Owen Family House and Cemetery was a historic home located near McDaniels, Sampson County, North Carolina.  The original house was built about 1800, and was a one-room log dwelling sheathed in weatherboard.  A second house on the property consists of a Greek Revival style main block attached to a large, early-19th-century, Federal style coastal cottage with engaged porch and rear shed rooms.  The front of the main block featured a gable-front porch form supported by four pillars with vernacular Doric order capitals.  Also on the property is a contributing brick potato house and a family cemetery.  The house has been demolished.

It was added to the National Register of Historic Places in 1986.

References

Houses on the National Register of Historic Places in North Carolina
Federal architecture in North Carolina
Greek Revival houses in North Carolina
Houses completed in 1800
Houses in Sampson County, North Carolina
National Register of Historic Places in Sampson County, North Carolina